The 1946–47 season was the 32nd in the history of the Isthmian League, an English football competition.

Leytonstone were champions, winning their fourth Isthmian League title.

League table

References

Isthmian League seasons
I